Roy Ananda is a South Australian artist and arts educator. He is Head of Drawing at Adelaide Central School of Art.

Biography 
Roy Ananda was born in Adelaide, South Australia, in 1980. He has a Bachelor of Visual Arts (Honours) from Adelaide Central School of Art and a Master of Arts from the University of South Australia. Ananda was the South Australian recipient of the Qantas Foundation Art Award in 2010.  His work has featured in the 2012 Heysen Sculpture Biennial and the 2018 Adelaide Biennial of Australian Art.

Portraits of Ananda by Deidre But-Husaim have been finalists in the 2011 Archibald Prize and the 2011 Doug Moran Portrait Prize.

Ananda was awarded the South Australian Living Artist Festival Publication in 2021.

Ananda is married to artist Julia Robinson.

Artistic style and subject 
Ananda is known for his large-scale sculptures and drawings referencing fandom and pop culture. Slow Crawl into Infinity recreated the opening words of Star Wars as a large-scale sculpture at the Samstag Museum in 2014.

Further reading 
 Purvis, Andrew, Klavins, Bernadette, Williams, Sean. Roy Ananda. Wakefield Press, 2021
 Ananda, Roy (2017). How to write a fan letter: The generative potential of pop-culture fandom in contemporary visual art practice. Master's Thesis, University of South Australia. 
 McKenzie, Jenna. Roy Ananda: How to write a fan letter. Artlink, Vol. 36, No. 4, Dec 2016: 56-59. 
 Sliuzas, Adele. Roy Ananda: The Devourer Sandra Uray-Kennett: A knights tour through a rent in the wall. Artlink, Vol. 33, No. 3, Sep 2013: 91.

References

External links 
 Entry in Design and Art Australia Online
 Lecturer profile 
 Roy Ananda - CACSA Contemporary 2010: The New New 
 Roy Ananda - Thin walls between dimensions 
 SALA 2017 - Roy Ananda vs Monte Masi Pecha Kucha Battle
 Spend some time with…Roy Ananda

Living people
Artists from Adelaide
Mixed-media artists
21st-century Australian sculptors
Australian art teachers
University of South Australia alumni
Artists from South Australia
Australian contemporary artists
1980 births